Inflammatory Linear Verrucous Epidermal Nevus is a rare disease of the skin that presents as multiple, discrete, red papules that tend to coalesce into linear plaques that follow the Lines of Blaschko.  The plaques can be slightly warty (psoriaform) or scaly (eczema-like).  ILVEN is caused by somatic mutations that result in genetic mosaicism.  There is no cure, but different medical treatments can alleviate the symptoms.

Classification
ILVEN is a condition that normally only affects one side of the body (unilateral).  Usually the left side of patients is affected.  The condition is persistent and forms along characteristic lines.  It usually appears on an extremity in infancy or childhood.  Altman and Mehregan described six characteristic features of ILVEN: (1) early age of onset, (2) predominance in females (4:1 female-male ratio), (3) frequent involvement of the left leg, (4) pruritus, or "itchiness" (5) marked refractoriness to therapy, and (6) a distinctive psoriasiform and inflammatory histologic appearance.

Genetics
Most cases are sporadic, but a familial case, with the condition occurring in a mother and her daughter, has been described.

It also has been proposed that activation of an autosomal dominant lethal mutation that survives by mosaicism may be the cause of the lesions. The mutated cells may survive in the due to proximity of normal cells. Another theory is that retrotransposable elements may be the cause of all skin conditions along the Lines of Blashko.  Some dogs have a coat variation based upon a similar mechanism.

The classification of the disease has much to do with the appearance and location of the lesions (phenotype characteristics).  As this is a rare condition, it is possible that more than one genotype could cause a similar phenotype.  Different genes have been implicated, but the number of patients studied in each case is very low.
There is some evidence that interleukins 1 and 6, tumor necrosis factor α, and intercellular adhesion molecule-1 are upregulated in ILVEN, similar to psoriasis.

Histopathology
-The plaques are characterized histologically by hyperkeratosis which is a thickening of the outer layer of skin.  Hyperkeratosis is often associated with an abnormal amount of keratin production.  Also characteristic is moderate acanthosis a thickening of the stratum spinosum with elongation of rete ridges.

- Characteristic histologic feature is regular alternation of slightly raised parakeratotic areas without a granular layer (hypogranulosis) and slightly depressed orthokeratotic areas with prominent granular layer (hypergranulosis). Orthokeratotic hyperkeratosis is characterised by hyperkeratosis with non-nucleated cells.  Parakeratotic hyperkeratosis is characterised by hyperkeratosis with nucleated cells.

- The orthokeratotic area shows a basket-weave-pattern.

- The dermis shows scattering of chronic inflammatory infiltrate (Munro's microabscess) sometimes giving a spongiform appearance.

This is very similar to linear psoriasis, but it has been noted that the diseases are distinct entities by immunohistochemical analyses.

Immunohistochemistry
Patients with ILVEN with and without associated psoriasis, the number of Ki-67 positive nuclei, tended to be lower than is typically found in psoriasis.  Additionally, the number of keratin-10 positive cells and HLA-DR expression was higher as compared to psoriasis. In ILVEN without associated psoriasis all T-cell subsets and cells expressing NK receptors were reduced as compared to psoriasis, except for CD45RA+ cells.   In particular the density of CD8+, CD45RO+ and CD2+, CD94 and CD161 showed a marked difference between ILVEN without psoriasis and psoriasis itself. T cells relevant in the pathogenesis of psoriasis are markedly reduced in ILVEN without psoriasis as compared to psoriasis.

Treatment
Reported treatments include topical agents, dermabrasion, cryotherapy, laser therapy, and surgical excision. These therapies have a high failure rate because of incomplete relief of symptoms, scarring, or recurrence .

Though similar in appearance, ILVEN will not respond to therapies known to affect psoriasis. ILVEN can be very difficult to live with but can be treated.  The most effective method is full-thickness excision of the lesion.  laser surgery can resurface the skin to give a flat, smoother and more normal appearance, but does not remove the lesion.

History
The condition later known as ILVEN was first described by Paul Gerson Unna in 1896. ILVEN appears very similar to psoriasis.  However, it was not until 1971 that the disorder was described and clearly defined as a distinct entity by Altman and Mehregan in a case study of 25 patients.  The Dupre and Christol described histopathological criteria in 1977.

Epidemiology
ILVEN usually appears in infancy or early childhood.  The condition is very rarely begun in adulthood. ILVEN occurs predominantly in females (female-male ratio, 4:1) with no racial predominance.

See also
 Linear verrucous epidermal nevus
 List of cutaneous conditions

References

Further reading

External links 

Epidermal nevi, neoplasms, and cysts